Abner Silberman (28 December 1899, in New York City, New York, United States – 24 November 1966) as pen name Abner Silver, was an American songwriter who worked primarily during the Tin Pan Alley era of the craft.

Career
Usually composing the music while others handled the lyrics, Silver wrote for half a century, starting with World War I–era songs such as 1918's "You Can't Blame the Girlies (They All Want to Marry a Soldier)," and continuing through the decades with such classics as 1921's "I'm Going South", 1925's "Chasing Shadows" and 1940's "How Did He Look?"  Silver frequently teamed with lyricists Benny Davis, Al Sherman and Al Lewis.  Between 1931 and 1934, during the last days of Vaudeville, Silver and several of his fellow hitmakers formed a sensational revue called "Songwriters on Parade", performing all across the Eastern seaboard on the Loew's and Keith circuits.

Silver's songs were covered by virtually every major vocalist of the day, among them Al Jolson, Ruth Etting, Jack Leonard, Mildred Bailey, Eddie Cantor, Rudy Vallee, Helen Kane, Kate Smith, Billie Holiday, Frank Sinatra, Tony Bennett, Mel Tormé, Eddie Fisher, Peggy Lee and Julie London. In a later era his songs were sung by Elvis Presley, Frankie Lymon, Etta Jones, Johnny Mathis, Brenda Lee and Dame Shirley Bassey. Numerous performers covered what became a country standard, "My Window Is Facing South," including Willie Nelson, Vassar Clements, Commander Cody and Lyle Lovett. Among band leaders who performed tunes composed by Silver were Django Reinhardt, Louis Prima, Lionel Hampton and Les McCann.

In the late 1950s he penned several numbers for Elvis Presley to perform in his movies, including the songs "Young and Beautiful," "What's She Really Like?" and "Lover Doll." Sung by Tom Jones, Silver's "With These Hands" (with lyrics by Benny Davis) was featured in the movie Edward Scissorhands, starring Johnny Depp. His early song "He's So Unusual" was covered by Cyndi Lauper on her breakout album, the similarly titled She's So Unusual.

Silver died on November 24, 1966, in New York.

Partial list of songwriting credits
1921 for the Broadway show Bombo, starring Al Jolson, "I'm Going South", with composer Harry M. Woods.
1925 "Chasing Shadows"
1927 "Barbara" with Billy Rose
1928 "Mary Ann", with Benny Davis
1929 "Bashful Baby" with Cliff Friend
1929 "Good Morning, Good Evening, Good Night" with Al Sherman and Al Lewis
1932 "Puh-leeze, Mr. Hemingway" with Walter Kent and Milton Drake
1934 "The Santa Claus Express" with Al Sherman and Al Lewis
1935 "Every Now and Then" with Al Sherman and Al Lewis
1935 "No! No! A Thousand Times No!! with Al Sherman and Al Lewis
1935 "On the Beach at Bali-Bali" with Al Sherman and Jack Maskill
1940 "How Did He Look?" with Gladys Shelley
1956 "Who Can Explain?"

External links
 Abner Silver recordings at the Discography of American Historical Recordings.

Jewish American songwriters
American musical theatre composers
Songwriters from New York (state)
1899 births
1966 deaths
20th-century American Jews